SME or Denník SME (in English: WE ARE Daily) is one of the most widely read mainstream broadsheets in Slovakia. Their website, SME.sk, is one of the most visited Internet portals in Slovakia.

History and profile
SME was founded in mid-January 1993.

SME appears 6 times a week. It is issued by Petit Press. The sister newspapers of SME include The Slovak Spectator, Új Szó, Korzár and various regional My noviny newspapers

The former managing editors were Martin M. Šimečka and founding editor-in-chief was Karol Ježík. Its target group is very wide, but officially it focuses on readers in bigger cities and agglomerations.

Its circulation in December 2006 was 76,590 copies. It was 53,000 copies in 2011. The paper had a circulation of 62,890 copies in September 2012. and 32,853 in January 2015 

In 2014, the Namav, a subject subvenced by the Penta Investments group, announced the purchase of Petit Press, the publisher of the newspaper. In reaction, a major part of the editorial board, including the editor-in-chief, announced their resignation. "We are leaving SME and we will try to create a new medium that no one will suspect that it serves someone other than the readers", stated Matúš Kostolný, the departing editor-in-chief. In the beginning of 2015, the departed board members started a new newspaper, Denník N.

Penta Investments group left Petit Press in 2021, six years after the hostile takeover.

References

External links
 

1993 establishments in Slovakia
Publications established in 1993
Newspapers published in Slovakia
Slovak-language newspapers
Mass media in Bratislava
Slovakian news websites